Paul Lawrence Dunbar School is an incorrect spelling for Paul Laurence Dunbar School and may refer to:

 Paul Laurence Dunbar School (Fort Myers, Florida)
 Paul Laurence Dunbar High School (Lexington, Kentucky)
 Paul Laurence Dunbar High School (Baltimore, Maryland)
 Paul Laurence Dunbar School (Philadelphia)
 Paul Laurence Dunbar High School (Fort Worth, Texas)
M Street High School in Washington D.C.
Dunbar High School (Washington, D.C.)

See also
Dunbar School (disambiguation)
Dunbar High School (disambiguation)